The Nashville Venom were a professional indoor football team, one of eight franchises of the Professional Indoor Football League (PIFL). Based in Nashville, Tennessee, the Venom were members of the American Conference. The team began play in 2014 as an expansion team. The team played at Nashville Municipal Auditorium in Nashville, which opened in 1962.

The Venom were the second indoor/arena football team to call Nashville home, and the first since the Arena Football League's Nashville Kats (1997–2001 and 2005–07).

After two seasons and the folding of the PIFL, the Venom ceased operations in 2015.

Franchise history

2014

In November, 2012, it was announced that the Venom would be the eighth and final expansion team of the Professional Indoor Football League for the 2014 season. A few days after being introduced it was announced by Managing Partner Jeff Knight that Billy Back would be the first coach in Venom history. The Venom began their inaugural season on March 29, 2014, in Huntsville, Alabama against the Alabama Hammers. Their first home game was on April 5, against the Harrisburg Stampede. The Venom finished the regular season 10-2, the best record in the league, and won the American Conference regular season title. Their nine All-PIFL selected players were the most of any team. In the American Conference Championship Game, the Venom defeated the Columbus Lions 44-39 to advance to PIFL Cup III. On July 12, 2014, the Venom won their first PIFL Cup Championship, defeating the Lehigh Valley Steelhawks 64-43.

2015

Following the 2015 PIFL season, the league folded and the franchise folded soon afterward.

Players of note

Final roster

Awards and honors
The following is a list of all Venom players who have won league awards:

All-League players
The following Venom players have been named to All-League Teams:
 WR Phillip Barnett, Jordan Jolly (2)
 OL Chris Thompson, Stanlee Bradley
 DL Wayne Daniels, James Frazier, Walter Thomas
 LB Cobrani Mixion, Douglas Rippy, Will Johnson
 DB Scooter Rogers, Corry Stewart (2), Kenny Veal
 K Christian Reed
 KR Mike Whittaker

Head coaches

Coaching staff

Season-by-season results

* Season currently in progress

References

External links 

 
2013 establishments in Tennessee
2015 disestablishments in Tennessee